Clannuda or Klannouda was a town of ancient Phrygia, inhabited in Hellenistic, Roman, and Byzantine times. It was mentioned in the Peutinger Table as Clanudda, which places it 30 M.P. from Aludda and 35 M.P. from Philadelphia.

Its site is located near Çırpıcılar in Asiatic Turkey.

References

Populated places in Phrygia
Former populated places in Turkey
Roman towns and cities in Turkey
Populated places of the Byzantine Empire
History of Uşak Province
Ulubey District